BD-07 436, also known as WASP-77 since 2012, is a binary star system about 344 light-years away.  The star's components appears to have a different age, with the secondary older than 9 billion years, while the primary's age is 5 billion years. The  BD-07 436 system's concentration of heavy elements is similar to the Sun. Its stars display moderate chromospheric activity, including x-ray flares.

The primary is a G-type main-sequence star, BD-07 436A (WASP-77A). The star is rotating rapidly, being spun up by the tides raised by the giant planet WASP-77Ab on its close orbit. The secondary is a K-type main-sequence star BD-07 436B orbiting at a distance of 461 AU.

Planetary system
In 2012 a transiting hot Jupiter planet b was detected on a very tight, circular orbit. The planet may have an extended gaseous envelope and is losing mass. Its equilibrium temperature is 1715 K,the nightside temperature measured in 2019 is 1786 K, and dayside planetary temperature measured in 2020 is 1842 K.

Water vapour was detected on the planetary dayside of WASP-77Ab, indicating C/O ratio similar to solar or even lower.

References

Cetus (constellation)
G-type main-sequence stars
K-type main-sequence stars
Binary stars
Planetary systems with one confirmed planet
Planetary transit variables
J02283722-0703384
Durchmusterung objects